The 2003 Nigerian Senate election in Gombe State was held on April 12, 2003, to elect members of the Nigerian Senate to represent Gombe State. Abubakar Mohammed representing Gombe Central and Tawar Umbi Wada representing Gombe South won on the platform of Peoples Democratic Party, while Haruna Garba representing Gombe North won on the platform of the All Nigeria Peoples Party.

Overview

Summary

Results

Gombe Central 
The election was won by Abubakar Mohammed of the Peoples Democratic Party.

Gombe South 
The election was won by Tawar Umbi Wada of the Peoples Democratic Party.

Gombe North 
The election was won by Haruna Garba of the All Nigeria Peoples Party.

References 

April 2003 events in Nigeria
Gombe State Senate elections
Gom